The  3rd Vijay Awards
ceremony honouring the winners of the best of Tamil film industry in 2008 was held at Jawaharlal Nehru Indoor Stadium on 13 June 2009. The 3rd Vijay Awards was sponsored by Univercell.

Winners

References 

2009 Indian film awards
Vijay Awards